In Israel, the Leader of the Opposition (Rosh HaOpozitzya) is the politician who leads the Official Opposition in the Knesset, the Israeli parliament. The Leader of the Opposition is, by convention, the leader of the largest political party in the Knesset that is not in (or supports) the government.

History

Informal role, until 2000
Until 2000, the role of the Opposition Leader was not an official position, but rather an honorary role. The Leader of the Opposition was the leader of the largest party not in government. This was either Likud or Labor, with short exceptions during national unity governments of 1967–1970 and 1984–1990.

Even with the absence of a law defining the role of the Opposition Leader, it was customary for the Prime Minister to hold regular meetings with the leader of the largest opposition party. However, it was carried out only at the prerogative of the Prime Minister.

Formalised role, post-2000
In early 2000, two bills to amend the Opposition Leader's status were submitted to the Knesset, one by the government and one by MK Uzi Landau. The bills were merged into one amendment, and on 17 July 2000, the Knesset approved Amendment 8 to the "Knesset Law" of 1994, adding chapter 6 that outlined the role of the Leader of the Opposition. The law stipulates the selection of the Opposition Leader, the method of their replacement, regulates their ceremonial role in various official events, and obliges the prime minister to update them once a month. The law also stipulates that the Opposition Leader's salary will be determined by Knesset committee, and shall not be lower than a salary of a Cabinet minister.

List of Opposition leaders

Leaders of the largest opposition party

Designated Opposition Leaders 
After Amendment 8 to the "Knesset law" of 1994 was passed, the Leader of the Opposition became the person elected by the largest faction of the opposition.

Notes

References

External links
Chapter 6: Leader of the Opposition, The Knesset law of 1994 Wikisource 

Government of Israel
Politics of Israel
Israel
Parliamentary opposition
Lists of political office-holders in Israel